The Indonesian blue-tongued skink (Tiliqua gigas) is a lizard in the family Scincidae. It is a close relative of the Eastern blue-tongued lizard. They are endemic to the island of New Guinea and other various surrounding islands. They are found typically in the rainforest, and in captivity, require high humidity. As opposed to Tiliqua scincoides, they are fairly lean. They're also accompanied by long tails (60–90% of their snout-vent length).

Description 
Tiliqua gigas has an elongated body and very small limbs, which is typical of most skinks of the genus. They typically get up to 18-24 inches (46-61 centimeters) in length and weigh up to 1 kilogram. They are known for their thinner, elongated tails, and avoiding participation in seasonal brumation as they regulate their breeding cycle on a wet and dry season.

T. gigas gigas are the most tropical and known for having the skinniest tail. They have solid, dark, or near solid dark limbs. T. gigas evanescens are easily recognized for having slightly more colored speckling on their limbs, a single, centered stripe on the back of their neck, and not always but most often, having very thin body banding. They also have the longest tail. Tiliqua gigas keyenesis is known for is all-over body speckling, including speckling all over the face.

The Australian Northern Blue Tongue (Tiliqua scincoides intermedia) is recognized as the largest of all the species and subspecies. Not enough studies have been conducted to give that title to either of the Tiliqua gigas species. What is irrefutable, is the Tiliqua gigas evanescens species is the longest of all the blue tongues often reaching lengths that exceed 30 inches from snout to tip of tail.

Subspecies 
There are currently three subspecies of Tiliqua gigas, and many localities within each subspecies. First subspecies to be recognized is Tiliqua gigas gigas (Schneider, 1801), in which there are the most and newest recognized localities including: Halmahera, Classic Indonesian, Sorong, Aru, Jayapura, Manokwari, and Ambon. The second subspecies is Tiliqua gigas keyensis (Oudemans, 1894), typically called the Kei island blue-tongued skink. Lastly, there is Tiliqua gigas evanescens, which is called the Merauke blue-tongued skink.

See also 
Eastern blue-tongued skink

Further reading 
https://www.tiliqua-time.com

References

Reptiles described in 1801
Taxa named by Johann Gottlob Theaenus Schneider
Tiliqua